The Laurinburg and Southern Railroad (reporting mark LRS) is a short-line railroad operating in North Carolina. The railroad has  of track that runs south from Raeford to Laurinburg, North Carolina and industries south of there. However much of the track is seldom run on and used for car storage. In the past the Laurinburg and Southern controlled a number of other small railroads in North Carolina and Virginia. The railroad has been owned by Gulf and Ohio Railways since 1994.

History
The Laurinburg & Southern was formed on March 4, 1909 as the Laurinburg & Southern Railroad Company and began operations in July over a line from Laurinburg to Wagram. Additional trackage was purchased from the Aberdeen & Rockfish into Raeford in 1921.

Acquisitions included the Fairmont & Western and Red Springs & Northern in 1984, the Franklin County Railroad and Nash County Railroad in 1985, as well as the Saltville Railroad in Virginia from 1982. The Yadkin Valley Railroad would begin operations in 1989 under L&S control.

Upon the 1994 acquisition of the Laurinburg & Southern holding company by Gulf & Ohio the railroad had been reduced to owning only its namesake line and two others, the Nash County railroad and Yadkin Valley Railroad. The other railroads had been abandoned or were out of service. The Yadkin Valley railroad and the Laurinburg & Southern are still operated by Gulf & Ohio. The former Nash County Railroad was sold in 2011 and now operates under the CLNA reporting mark.

Traffic
L&S moves 7,500 cars annually serving four industries utilizing three locomotives. The following items are currently shipped on the L&S:
 Feed Ingredients
 Soda Ash
 Lime
 Fertilizer
 Chemicals
 Glass

L&S has an interchange with CSX in Laurinburg, North Carolina. It formerly had an interchange with Aberdeen and Rockfish Railroad in Raeford, North Carolina.

See also

Gulf and Ohio Railways
Aberdeen and Rockfish Railroad

References

External links
G&O: Laurinburg & Southern Railroad

North Carolina railroads
Gulf and Ohio Railways
Railway companies established in 1909